A Train Leaves in Every Hour is a 1961 Belgian drama film directed by André Cavens. It was entered into the 12th Berlin International Film Festival.

Cast
 Evelyne Axell as Isabelle
 Cécile Brandt
 Henri De Bruder
 Nicole Denise
 Irena Fensie
 Stig Gerson as Eric
 Gaston Joostens
 Magda Stevens
 Piero Vitali

References

External links

1961 films
1960s French-language films
1961 drama films
Belgian black-and-white films
Rail transport films
Belgian drama films
French-language Belgian films